The Jella Lepman medal is an award made to individuals and institutions that have made lasting contributions to children's literature. It is named after Jella Lepman (1891-1970), founder of the International Board on Books for Young People (IBBY) and the International Youth Library (IYL) in Munich. It was created in 1991 to celebrate her 100th birthday. It was reinstated in 2005.

Recipients of the Jella Lepman Medal, 1991 
Individuals
 Richard Bamberger, Vienna (Austria) - founding member of IBBY and former President
 Jo Tenfjord, Oslo (Norway) - founding member of IBBY and former Vice President
 Fritz Brunner, Zurich (Switzerland) - founding member of IBBY and former treasurer
 John Donovan, New York (USA) - former treasurer of IBBY
Institutions/organisations
 Pro Juventute, Zurich (Switzerland)
 International Youth Library, Munich (Germany)
 Biennale of Illustrations, Bratislava (Slovakia)
 Bologna International Children’s Book Fair, Bologna (Italy)
 The Asahi Shimbun Newspaper Company, Tokyo (Japan)
 IBBY Documentation Centre of Books for Disabled Young People, Oslo (Norway)

Recipients of the Jella Lepman Medal, 2006 
 Hideo Yamada, Okayama Prefecture (Japan) - President of the Yamada Apiculture Center Inc.  for his generous support of IBBY and its projects through the IBBY-Yamada Fund
 The Nissan Motor Co., Tokyo (Japan) - as tribute for their longstanding support of the Hans Christian Andersen Awards
 Vincent Frank-Steiner, Basel (Switzerland) - for his expert financial advice

Recipients of the Jella Lepman Medal, 2010 
 Joan Glazer, Warwick (Rhode Island, USA) - in acknowledgement of her magnificent contribution to IBBY as President of Bookbird Inc Board.

Recipients of the Jella Lepman medal, 2014 
 Nami Island Inc. (South Korea) - for their sponsorship of the Hans Christian Andersen Award

Recipients of the Jella Lepman medal, 2018 
 Katherine Paterson (USA) - in gratitude and recognition of her outstanding contribution to IBBY

References

Children's literary awards
International awards
International Board on Books for Young People